Eileen Forrest is an Australian female kickboxer and mixed martial artist. In 2010 Eileen Forrest defeated Chantal Ughi to win the ISKA Muay Thai World Light Welterweight Championship

Kickboxing Titles

ISKA World title holder
WKA Australian featherweight champion
WMC Queensland Junior Lightweight champion
WKBF Queensland Lightweight champion

Kickboxing record

|- style="background:#cfc;"
|
|Win
|align=left| Chantal Ughi	
|Warriors at War
|align=left| Brisbane, Australia
|Decision
|5
|3:00
|
|-
! style=background:white colspan=9 |
|-
| colspan=9| Legend:

Professional boxing record

Mixed martial arts record

|-
| Loss
| align=center| 0-1
| Claire Haigh
| Submission (Rear-Naked Choke)
| MC - Martial Combat 12
| 
| align=center| 2
| align=center| 2:06
| Singapore
|

References

External links
 Eileen Forrest at Awakening Fighters

1986 births
Australian female kickboxers
Living people
Australian women boxers
People from Gladstone, Queensland
Australian female mixed martial artists
Australian Muay Thai practitioners
Bantamweight mixed martial artists
Mixed martial artists utilizing Muay Thai
Mixed martial artists utilizing boxing
Female Muay Thai practitioners
Welterweight kickboxers